Histriobdellidae is a family of annelids belonging to the order Eunicida.

Genera:
 Histriobdella Van Beneden, 1858 
 Histriodrilus Foettinger, 1884 
 Steineridrilus Zhang, 2014 
 Stratiodrilus Haswell, 1900

References

Annelids